Austin Adiele Opara , (born 28 August 1963) is a Nigerian politician of the People's Democratic Party. He was raised in Diobu, Port Harcourt and is of the Ikwerre tribe.

Education
Opara has a Higher National Diploma and a Bachelor of Science in Marketing option from the Rivers State University of Science and Technology. He obtained his Master of Business Administration, from the same institution. In addition, he is certified in Public Financial Management and Mastering Negotiations from John F. Kennedy School of Government in the United States.

Early career
Opara started as a lecturer with the Rivers State School of Basic Studies and later as Head of Purchasing Department at Horicon Dredging Nigeria Limited, Port Harcourt.

Political career
In 1999, he was elected to the House of Representatives, representing Port Harcourt II (federal constituency). He was reelected in 2003 and served as the deputy speaker until 2007. While at the Assembly, he served also as deputy chairman of National Assembly Joint Committee on the Review of the 1999 Constitution, sub-chairman of House Committee on the Nigerian National Petroleum Corporation, member of House Committee on Petroleum, deputy chairman of House Committee on the Niger Delta Development Commission and member, House Committee on National Security and intelligence.

In November 2015, Opara was appointed board chairman of the Rivers State Microfinance Agency.

See also
List of people from Rivers State
List of Nigerian Senators from Rivers State

References

1963 births
Living people
Rivers State Peoples Democratic Party politicians
People from Diobu, Port Harcourt
Heads of Rivers State government agencies and parastatals
Rivers State University alumni
Harvard Kennedy School alumni
Members of the House of Representatives (Nigeria) from Rivers State
Ikwerre people
Peoples Democratic Party members of the House of Representatives (Nigeria)